The 1913 Tasmanian state election was held on Thursday, 23 January 1913 in the Australian state of Tasmania to elect 30 members of the Tasmanian House of Assembly. The election used the Hare-Clark proportional representation system — six members were elected from each of five electorates.

The 1913 election was called less than a year after the 1912 election. Following the 1912 election, the Liberal League held only a small majority in the House of Assembly, and Premier Albert Solomon was dependent on the support of Norman Cameron. In addition, Solomon was under threat from the same CLP unrest that had unseated his predecessor, Elliott Lewis. Labor sought to capitalise on Solomon's tenuous grasp on government, and moved a series of no-confidence motions against him, including a censure motion over the Mount Lyell disaster.

In an attempt to secure his position, Solomon requested and received from the Governor of Tasmania an early dissolution of the House of Assembly, and an early election. The result was the same as had been in the outgoing House of Assembly, except that Cameron lost his seat to another Liberal.

Solomon's advantage, however, was short-lived. The Liberals lost a seat in a by-election, and Joshua Whitsitt's behaviour was becoming erratic. Solomon lost a no-confidence motion in April 1914, and the Governor denied his request for another dissolution, calling upon John Earle to form a Labor government.

Results

|}

Distribution of votes

Primary vote by division

Distribution of seats

See also
 Members of the Tasmanian House of Assembly, 1913–1916
 Candidates of the 1913 Tasmanian state election

References

External links
Assembly Election Results, 1913, Parliament of Tasmania.
Report on General Election, 1913, Tasmanian Electoral Commission, 8 July 1913.

Elections in Tasmania
1913 elections in Australia
1910s in Tasmania
January 1913 events